Carol Anne Page  née Carol Bartlett (born 1948), is a female retired British sport shooter.

Sport shooting career
Page represented Great Britain at the 1984 Summer Olympics in the women's 25 metre pistol and at the 1996 Summer Olympics in the women's 25 metre pistol and women's 10 metre air pistol.

Page represented England and won two bronze medals, at the 1994 Commonwealth Games in Victoria, British Columbia, Canada. She won the first with Margaret Thomas in the 10 metres air pistol pairs and the second in 25 metres sport pistol pairs, also with Thomas. Four years later she represented England in the air pistol events, at the 1998 Commonwealth Games in Kuala Lumpur, Malaysia.

References

Living people
1948 births
British female sport shooters
Commonwealth Games medallists in shooting
Commonwealth Games bronze medallists for England
Shooters at the 1994 Commonwealth Games
Olympic shooters of Great Britain
Shooters at the 1996 Summer Olympics
Shooters at the 1984 Summer Olympics
Medallists at the 1994 Commonwealth Games